Lampyris noctiluca, the common glow-worm of Europe (see also "glowworm"), is the type species of beetle in the genus Lampyris and the family Lampyridae.

Lampyris noctiluca presents a conspicuous sexual dimorphism.

These beetles use their bioluminescence to attract mates. The adult females are mostly famed for their glow, although all stages of their life cycle are capable of glowing.

In Britain, this species is fairly common compared to its cousin Phosphaenus hemipterus – the lesser glow worm – which is very rare.

Distribution
The range of this beetle stretches from Portugal and Ireland in the west, right across Europe, Africa and Asia to China in the east. It also survives further north than any other firefly, almost reaching the Arctic Circle. It is not found in North America, South America, South Asia, Australia and Antarctica.

Light production

Light production is vital for Lampyris noctiluca. With it they have greater chances of mating, so there is a complex process involved.

They emit yellowish-green light from the translucent underside of their last three abdominal segments to attract the smaller males, which are winged. They will glow for two hours and then retreat back into their hiding place until the next night, or stop glowing as soon as they find a mate. The females can survive for at least 10 consecutive nights doing this.

The light can be seen by males up to 45 metres away. The light is emitted continuously, although they will wave their abdomens from side to side, which gives the impression of it brightening and dimming. Larvae are sometimes seen to glow, although they seem able to turn off their light more easily than the female, especially when disturbed.

The insect can regulate its light production by controlling the oxygen supply to the light emitting membranes containing luciferin. The chemical reaction producing the light from luciferin is catalysed by luciferase, the exact chemical structure of which is determined by the glow worms' individual genetic structure, which in turn determines subtle differences in the light produced from individual to individual. Virtually all of the energy produced is light; only 2% is heat.

The brightness of the glow is used by the males as an indicator of female fecundity. Males are more likely to fly to a brighter female, because it is larger and has more eggs. Due to this, females compete against each other for matings.

The males are sometimes attracted to man-made light fixtures.

The peak glowing period is evenings in June and July.

Habitat
They are found in old-growth grassland, especially on chalk and limestone soils. They are also found in verges, hedgebanks, and on heaths. The larvae live in sheltered places – under rocks and wood, but do crawl over different terrains.

Lifecycle
  

Once the females have attracted the males with their glow, they mate, lay eggs, and die.

Typically, 50–100 are laid over three days, with the adult not surviving to see them hatch.  They are laid in fairly moist places, e.g. stems of grass, under moss and under leaf litter.

The eggs are pale yellow, 1 mm across. They may glow faintly yellow.

The eggs hatch after two or three weeks, possibly longer in colder climates.  Larvae and adult females look similar, but larvae have bright spots on each of 12 segments, whereas adult females have a completely black back.

The predatory larvae feed for two or three years on slugs and snails which they inject with a brown, toxic, digestive fluid, delivered by a series of nips and bites. The poison takes time to work, and the larva must to be careful not to become stuck to any protective mucus that its prey may secrete. The prey is gradually paralysed and the digestive fluid turns part of it into a brown broth that the larva can lap up. The prey remains alive, and some partially eaten victims have been known to crawl away after the meal.

The slugs and snails are often 200 times the weight of the beetle larva. The larvae are nocturnal, and are most active during moist conditions, when their prey are most active.

The larvae may moult four to five times in their lifetimes. They spend winters under logs, stones, wood holes, or leaf litter, their bodies drawn in like concertinas, hibernating as food becomes increasingly difficult to find. They awaken in spring, and the cycle is repeated for one more year, or possibly two.

They become adults from May to July or sometimes later, surviving on food reserves accumulated during time as a larva, and dying after reproducing.

Threats to species numbers
Threats include habitat destruction, habitat fragmentation, pesticide use, pollution, distraction by artificial lights, insufficient grazing and climate change.

References

External links

Identification of European Glowworms
Kendall Bioresearch
The UK Glow Worm survey home page contains a wealth of information on this species
UK Distribution
 Biolib

Lampyridae
Beetles of Europe
Bioluminescent insects
Beetles described in 1767
Taxa named by Carl Linnaeus